Girolamo Gamberati or Gamberato (1550-1628) was an Italian painter active in his native Venice.

Biography
He learned design from Giuseppe Porta and color from Jacopo Palma il Giovane, painters with whom he collaborated on projects in the Doge's Palace. In the Sala del Maggior Consiglio, he painted an episode of the History of Ancona, placed above the door leading to the Quarantìa della Sala. It depicts a meeting in Ancona between Doge Sebastiano Ziani, Emperor Frederick Barbarossa, and Pope Alexander III, where all three were given gold umbrellas by the citizens. The pope gives his to the Doge.

References

1550 births
1628 deaths
16th-century Italian painters
Italian male painters
17th-century Italian painters
Painters from Venice